Egypt Falls, also known as Appin Falls, the Curtains and Piper's Glen Falls, is a waterfall located in the Municipality of the County of Inverness, Nova Scotia, Canada. The waterfall and the trail leading up to it are one of the most popular hiking spots in Cape Breton. Work on the trail is being done to make it more accessible and less dangerous. The trail is located on private property.

References 

Waterfalls of Nova Scotia
Hiking trails in Nova Scotia
Tourist attractions in Inverness County, Nova Scotia
Geography of Inverness County, Nova Scotia